Picture Day is a Canadian teen comedy-drama film written, directed and co-produced by Kate Melville. The film stars Tatiana Maslany, Spencer Van Wyck, Steven McCarthy, and Susan Coyne. The film had its world premiere at the 2012 Toronto International Film Festival on September 7, 2012.

The film was released straight to video in the United States on May 21, 2013, by Ketchup Entertainment, and in a limited release in Canada on May 24, 2013.

Cast 
 Tatiana Maslany as Claire
 Spencer Van Wyck as Henry
 Troy Lebane as Young Henry
 Fiona Highet as Annie
 Steven McCarthy as Jim
 Susan Coyne as Ruth
 Fiona Highet as Annie
 Catherine Finch as Vice Principal
 Mark DeBonis as Lewis

Production
The film was shot in the fall of 2011 in downtown Toronto, Ontario.

Release
The film had its world premiere at the Toronto International Film Festival on September 7, 2012. The film had its United States premiere at the RiverRun Film Festival on April 14, 2013. The film was released on May 24, 2013, in Canada by Mongrel Media and on May 21, 2013, in the United States by Ketchup Entertainment.

Awards and nominations

References

External links 

 
 

2012 films
2012 comedy-drama films
2010s coming-of-age comedy-drama films
2010s teen comedy-drama films
Canadian comedy-drama films
Canadian coming-of-age comedy-drama films
Canadian high school films
English-language Canadian films
Films set in Toronto
Films shot in Toronto
2010s English-language films
2010s Canadian films